Zizyphia zizyphella is a moth in the family Gelechiidae. It was described by Hans Georg Amsel in 1935 and is found in Palestine.

References

Gelechiinae
Moths described in 1935